Las Minas District is a district (distrito) of Herrera Province in Panama. The population according to the 2000 census was 7,945. The district covers a total area of 437 km². The capital lies at the city of Las Minas.

Administrative divisions
Las Minas District is divided administratively into the following corregimientos:

Las Minas (capital)
Chepo
Chumical
El Toro
Leones
Quebrada del Rosario
Quebrada El Ciprián

References

Districts of Panama
Herrera Province